Anton Villatoro (born June 10, 1970 in Guatemala City, Guatemala) is a Guatemalan former professional cyclist. He attended the University of Colorado, where he raced with future US Postal teammate Tyler Hamilton. Villatoro won the 1991 Junior Tour of Guatemala, a gold medal at the 1994 Central American Games (team time trial) and placed fourth at the 1995 Pan American Games (time trial). In 1996, he represented Guatemala at the Olympic Games in Atlanta.

He raced for the US Postal Service Cycling Team from 1996–1998 and then served as team captain for Team 7-UP from 1999 to 2000.
 
He retired in 2001 to pursue business interests.

References

sports-reference

Anton Villatoro website

1970 births
Living people
Guatemalan male cyclists
Olympic cyclists of Guatemala
Cyclists at the 1996 Summer Olympics
Cyclists at the 1999 Pan American Games
Guatemalan people of American descent
Sportspeople from Boulder, Colorado
Pan American Games competitors for Guatemala